Bryanites is a genus of beetles in the family Carabidae, containing the following species:

 Bryanites barri Valentine, 1987
 Bryanites samoaensis Valentine, 1987

References

Platyninae